Argonia is a small city in Kansas, United States.

Argonia may also refer to:
 Argonia USD 359, a school district centred on the city
 Argonia, or Black Marsh, a fictional region in The Elder Scrolls series of video games
 a fictional location in the 1990 video game StarTropics
 a fictional location in the 2003 film Advanced Warriors

See also 
 Argonian (disambiguation)